Transport Nagar (Pokkuvarathu Nagar) is a small locality in South of  Madurai City behind Madurai Airport. Its 3.5 km far from Madurai International Airport New Terminal, Its pincode is 625022.  The area has 200 houses, and includes a Temple, Church, Mosque, Playground, Library, Marriage Hall and Nursery School.

Bus facility 
           
The bus facility at Transport Nagar is well, by the bus service from Madurai central bus stand (Periyar) 
by the bus no.10L

References

Neighbourhoods and suburbs of Madurai